Sir George Augustus Pape (29 January 1903 – 15 June 1987) was an Australian lawyer and judge. He became a Queen's Counsel in 1955 and a judge in the Supreme Court of Victoria in 1957. He was knighted in 1968 and retired from the Supreme Court in 1975.

Biography
Pape was educated at All Saints Grammar School, St Kilda; and the University of Melbourne. From 1940 to 1946 he served in the Royal Australian Air Force and was discharged with the rank of Squadron Leader.

Legal cases
Pape participated in four inquiries into major aircraft accidents in Australia:
In the inquiry into the 1946 Australian National Airways DC-3 crash, Pape juniored to Dr E.G. Coppel KC who represented Australian National Airways, the aircraft operator.
In the inquiry into the 1948 Australian National Airways DC-3 crash, Pape represented Australian National Airways, the aircraft operator.
In the inquiry into the 1949 MacRobertson Miller Aviation DC-3 crash, Pape represented MacRobertson Miller Aviation, the aircraft operator.
In the inquiry into the 1950 Australian National Airways Douglas DC-4 crash, Pape represented Australian National Airways, the aircraft operator.

In 1952 the state of Victoria challenged the power of the Commonwealth of Australia to impose uniform taxation law. The state government retained four counsel – Henry Winneke, Garfield Barwick, Douglas Menzies and George Pape.

In the aftermath of the Petrov Affair in 1954, Prime Minister Robert Menzies established the Royal Commission on espionage. Pape was one of two counsel retained to assist the Chief Counsel for the Commonwealth.

See also
List of Judges of the Supreme Court of Victoria

Notes

References

Bibliography
 Fyshwick, Australia. pp. 200. 

1903 births
Royal Australian Air Force officers
Judges of the Supreme Court of Victoria
University of Melbourne alumni
Melbourne Law School alumni
Australian King's Counsel
20th-century King's Counsel
Australian Knights Bachelor
1987 deaths